OpenESB is a Java-based open-source enterprise service bus. It can be used as a platform for both enterprise application integration and service-oriented architecture. OpenESB allows developers to integrate legacy systems, external and internal partners and new development in business processes.  It supports a multitude of integration technologies including standard JBI (Java Business Integration), XML with support for XML Schemas, WSDL, and BPEL with the aim of simplicity, efficiency, long-term durability, and low TCO (Total Cost of Ownership).

It used to be owned by Sun Microsystems, but after Oracle and Sun Microsystems merged  (see: Sun acquisition by Oracle), the OpenESB Community was created to maintain, improve, promote and support OpenESB.

Architecture
OpenESB consists of 5 parts: the framework, the container, the components, the Integrated Development Environment and the development plugins.

Framework
The framework consists of a lightweight JBI implementation in Java. This implementation is container-agnostic and can work on any platform and any container. Even if development and support are mainly focused on Glassfish V2 and V3 platforms, beta projects on JBoss and standalone JVM work well and are in progress (2012 Q2). In addition to the OpenESB framework being lightweight, it is also reliable and highly scalable.  It is embedded in a Java virtual machine and communicates with other framework instances through Binding components. This architecture matches perfectly with new cloud architectures and allows easy deployment and management on very complex infrastructures. The framework is fully manageable with any JMX-based tool such as Jconsole or more sophisticated tools like Opsview or Nagios.

The framework implements a virtual bus known as the Normalised Message Router (NMR). This is a powerful asynchronous intelligent communication channel between components.

Components
The JBI specification defines 2 component types: The services engine (SE) and the binding component (BC). The SE and BC implement the same interface contract, however, they behave differently:

- Binding components act as the interface between the outside world and the bus, being able to generate bus messages upon receipt of stimuli from an external source, or generate an external action/interaction in response to a message received from the bus.

- Service engines receive messages from the bus and send messages to the bus. SE's have no direct contact with the outside world.  They rely on the bus for interaction with other components, whether binding components or other service engines.

OpenESB includes many Components 'out of the box'.

OpenESB Binding Components

OpenESB Service Engines

Integrated Development Environment & Plugins 
OpenESB offers a set of graphical tools to ease complex SOA and integration developments.  Powerful XLM, XML Schema, WSDL, BPEL editor, data mapping and Composition Applications graphical editors are proposed with OpenESB.  Similarly, build, deploy, un-deploy, run, test and debug tasks are managed by graphical tools. OpenESB provides the best ergonomics for ESB and SOA developments.

Container
OpenESB V3.1.2 does not use any container but just a JVM. So, its memory footprint is very low (less than 300 Mo) and allows OpenESB to run in a Raspberry PI or in a many instances on a cloud.
Next versions are planned for 2019.

OpenESB community 
The table below lists the web sites and forum managed by OpenESB community

See also 
 Service-oriented architecture (SOA)
 Service Component Architecture (SCA)
 Apache Camel
 Apache CXF
 System integration
 Enterprise Service Bus
 Enterprise Integration Patterns
 Event-driven SOA
 Java CAPS
 eclipse sirius - Free and GPL eclipse tool to build your own arbitrary complex military grade modeling tools on one hour
 eclipse SCA Tools - Gnu free composite tool
 Free GPL obeodesigner made with eclipse sirius

References 

Java Business Integration

JBI specification

External links 
OpenESB project
Pymma OpenESB Enterprise Edition, Consulting, training, architecture design,development and Global 24x7 Support 
LogiCoy OpenESB Development, Consulting and Global 24x7 Support
Youtube - NetBeans Open ESB SOA Tools, Composite Application, CASA
Quick Start Guide to the NetBeans Open ESB CASA Editor
https://soa.netbeans.org/

Integration platform
Middleware
Java enterprise platform